Ava is an unincorporated community in Perry County, Arkansas, United States. It is located on the south side of the South Fourche La Fave River floodplain and Arkansas Highway 314 passes on the north side of the river.

The Hawks Schoolhouse, which is listed on the National Register of Historic Places, is near the community.

References

Unincorporated communities in Perry County, Arkansas
Unincorporated communities in Arkansas